A settlement in trusts law is a deed (also called a trust instrument) whereby real estate, land, or other property is given by a settlor into trust so the beneficiary has the limited right to the property (for example, during their life), but usually has no right to sell, bequeath or otherwise transfer it. Instead the property devolves as directed by the settlement.

History
In most jurisdictions, settlements only confer beneficial rights under a trust. They were formerly used to create legal estates for life or in tail, or to make provision for portions for younger children.

See also
English trust law
Settled Land Acts
Trust Law

External links

Wills and trusts 
Equity (law)
Legal documents